Jibbs featuring Jibbs is the only studio album by St. Louis, Missouri, rapper Jibbs. It was released on October 24, 2006. The album is produced by Da Beatstaz, David Banner, Polow da Don, and Maestro, and includes performances by Chamillionaire, Melody Thornton of Pussycat Dolls and Fabo of D4L. The first single was "Chain Hang Low", the second was "King Kong", the third was "Go Too Far", and the fourth and final single was "Smile".

The record was met with mixed reception from music critics. Jibbs featuring Jibbs debuted at number 11 on the Billboard 200, with about 50,000 copies sold in its first week. It also debuted at numbers four and eight on both the Rap Albums and R&B/Hip-Hop Albums charts respectively. The album went on to sell over 125,000 copies in the United States.

Critical reception

AllMusic editor David Jeffries noticed the similarities to fellow St. Louis rappers Nelly and Chingy but found the album to be styled like "an LL Cool J release for the '80s." He concluded with: "Good flow, good beats, and overall, a good time." Entertainment Weeklys Michael Endelman commended Jibbs for displaying potential as a rapper but felt that he spends "most of the disc trying out too many different styles — from slow-rolling Houston grooves to Nelly-style pop-rap — instead of defining a sound of his own." Steve 'Flash' Juon of RapReviews found his performance to be average with rhymes that were "acceptable albeit entirely generic and run of the mill." He also said that the production from Da Beatstaz helped save the album and that it should be retitled "Da Beatstaz Feat. Jibbs." He concluded with: "Jibbs Feat. Jibbs is not an altogether bad album, but really does nothing to put Jibbs on the map. You could easily substitute any one of a dozen rappers in or outside St. Louis over these tracks and get the same result - anybody from Ali to Cool Breeze to Bubba Sparxxx."

Track listing

 (co.) Co-producer

Charts

Personnel

Source:

References

2006 debut albums
Jibbs albums
Geffen Records albums
Albums produced by David Banner
Albums produced by Dr. Luke
Albums produced by Polow da Don
Albums produced by Zaytoven